is a Japanese actress, voice actress and singer from Chichibu, Saitama. Her major voice acting roles include Yuki Yuna is a Hero as Itsuki Inubozaki, Arknights as Amiya, Sound! Euphonium as Kumiko Ōmae, Otome Arisugawa in Aikatsu!, Rebecca in Cyberpunk: Edgerunners, Annabella in Tower of Fantasy, Miria Akagi in The Idolmaster Cinderella Girls and Land of the Lustrous as Phosphophyllite.

Biography
Kurosawa began studying acting at the age of 3. In 2000, she began appearing in TV dramas, commercials and stage performances.

Kurosawa became a support member of Sound Horizon in 2008, appearing in their sixth CD story "Moira" that same year, and in Sound Horizon's seventh CD story "Märchen", released in 2010. She made her voice acting debut as Natsuki Koyama in the 2010 anime film Welcome to the Space Show. In 2012, she moved from Space Craft to Mausu Promotion. 

In August 2020, Kurosawa moved again from Mausu Production to Toho Geino. 

On October 9, 2020, it was announced that she had tested positive for COVID-19. She was discharged on October 19.

Filmography

Television drama
Aoi Tokugawa Sandai (2000) – Ichihime
Say Hello to Black Jack (2003) – Yumi
Attention Please (2006) – Yoko Misaki (childhood)
Examination of God (2007)
Sesame Street (2007) – Junko

Television animation
2012
Aikatsu! – Otome Arisugawa
Black Rock Shooter – female student B, girls A, basketball staff, girls C, Manager, classmate B

2014
Amagi Brilliant Park – Sylphy
Black Bullet  – Tina Sprout
Locodol  – Tsubasa Tsurugi
Yuki Yuna is a Hero  – Itsuki Inubozaki

2015
The Idolmaster Cinderella Girls  – Miria Akagi
Seraph of the End  – Mirai Kimizuki
Sound! Euphonium – Kumiko Ōmae

2016
Active Raid  – Liko
Ragnastrike Angels – Ayano Anemori
Sound! Euphonium 2 – Kumiko Ōmae
Tsukiuta. The Animation – Reina Ichisaki

2017
Idol Time PriPara – Garara•S•Leep
Land of the Lustrous – Phosphophyllite
Love and Lies – Kagetsu Ichijō
Sakura Quest – Erika Suzuki
Yuki Yuna is a Hero: Hero Chapter  – Itsuki Inubozaki

2018
BanG Dream! Girls Band Party! Pico – Misaki Okusawa/Michelle
Cutie Honey Universe – Flash Honey
Dragon Pilot: Hisone and Masotan – Nao Kaizaki
FLCL Progressive – Aiko
Mr. Tonegawa: Middle Management Blues – Zawa Voice (006)
Karakuri Circus – Talanda "Lise" Liselotte Tachibana
The Girl in Twilight – Asuka Tsuchimiya

2019
Afterlost – Ryōko
Astra Lost in Space – Quitterie Raffaëlli
BanG Dream! 2nd Season – Misaki Okusawa/Michelle
O Maidens in Your Savage Season – Hitoha Hongō

2020
Akudama Drive – Ordinary Person / Swindler
BanG Dream! 3rd Season – Misaki Okusawa/Michelle
BanG Dream! Girls Band Party! Pico: Ohmori – Misaki Okusawa/Michelle
Listeners – Zende Neubauten
Rail Romanesque – Kurenai
Uchitama?! Have you seen my Tama? – Koma Oketani
Wandering Witch: The Journey of Elaina – Saya

2021
BanG Dream! Girls Band Party! Pico Fever! – Misaki Okusawa/Michelle
Farewell, My Dear Cramer – Sumire Suō
Laid-Back Camp Season 2 – Ayano Toki
Megaton Musashi – Asuna Kanzaki
One Piece  – Ulti
Record of Ragnarok – Göll
Yuki Yuna is a Hero: The Great Mankai Chapter  – Itsuki Inubozaki

2022
Akiba Maid War – Shiipon
Arknights: Prelude to Dawn – Amiya
Cyberpunk: Edgerunners – Rebecca
Girls' Frontline – P7
Prima Doll – Haikagura

2023
Heavenly Delusion – Kuku
Mahō Shōjo Magical Destroyers – Pink
Record of Ragnarok II – Göll
Skip and Loafer – Mitsumi Iwakura
The Idolmaster Cinderella Girls U149 – Miria Akagi
Trigun Stampede – Young Vash

Theatrical animation
Fudeko Sono Ai: Tenshi no Piano (2007) – Sachiko Ishii
Welcome to the Space Show (2010) – Natsuki Koyama
Jewelpet the Movie: Sweets Dance Princess (2012) – Princess Mana
Majocco Shimai no Yoyo to Nene (2013)
Aikatsu! (2014) – Otome Arisugawa
Aikatsu!: The Targeted Magical Aikatsu! Card (2016) – Otome Arisugawa
Pop In Q (2016) – Saki Tsukui
Sound! Euphonium: The Movie – Welcome to the Kitauji High School Concert Band (2016) – Kumiko Oumae
Sound! Euphonium: Todoketai Melody (2017) – Kumiko Oumae
Liz and the Blue Bird (2018) – Kumiko Oumae
Love Live! Sunshine!! The School Idol Movie: Over the Rainbow (2019) – Tsuki Watanabe
BanG Dream! Film Live (2019) – Misaki Okusawa/Michelle
Sound! Euphonium The Movie – Our Promise: A Brand New Day (2019) – Kumiko Oumae
My Hero Academia: Heroes Rising (2019) – Mahoro Shimano
Crayon Shin-chan: Crash! Rakuga Kingdom and Almost Four Heroes (2020) – Yūma
BanG Dream! Film Live 2nd Stage (2021) – Misaki Okusawa/Michelle
Laid-Back Camp Movie (2022) – Ayano Toki

Video games
Aikatsu! Cinderella Lesson (2012) – Otome Arisugawa
Aikatsu! Futari no My Princess (2013) – Otome Arisugawa
The Idolmaster Cinderella Girls (2013) – Miria Akagi
Rage of Bahamut (2014) – Mito
Bladedance of Elementalers DayDreamDuel (2014) – Lulu
Nekomimi Survivor! (2014) – Hakase
82H Blossom (2014) – Yuzuki Negishi
 Valkyrie Drive: Siren (2015) – Kotona Misaki
 Nights of Azure (2015) – Christophorus
 Band Yarouze! (2016) – Miley
 Tales of Berseria (2016)-  Kamoana (Moana)
 Final Fantasy XV (2016) – Talcott Hester (young)
 Girls' Frontline (2016) - P7
 BanG Dream! Girls Band Party! (2017) – Misaki Okusawa/Michelle
 Yuki Yuna is a Hero: Hanayui no Kirameki (2017) - Itsuki Inubozaki
 Nights of Azure 2: Bride of the New Moon (2017) – Christophorus
 Idol Time PriPara (2017) – Garara・S・Leep
 Shin Megami Tensei: Strange Journey Redux (2017) – Chen
Grand Chase Dimensional Chaser Global (2017) – Arme Glenstid
Azur Lane (2017) – South Dakota
Azur Lane (2017) – Mutsu
Closers Online (2018) – Luna Aegis
Our World is Ended (2019) – Girl A
AI: The Somnium Files (2019) – Mizuki
Sid Story – Fenrir, Nicolini, Jefferson
Arknights (2019) – Amiya
Fire Emblem: Three Houses (2019) – Sothis
Fire Emblem Heroes (2019) – Sothis
Super Smash Bros. Ultimate (2020) – Sothis
Granblue Fantasy (2020) – Meg
Final Fantasy Brave Exvius (2020) – Physalis
Dragalia Lost (2020) - Lapis
Digimon New Century - Youko Aragaki
Rune Factory 5 (2021) - Beatrice
The Caligula Effect 2 (2021) – Pandora
Cookie Run Kingdom (2021) – Mango Cookie
AI: The Somnium Files – nirvanA Initiative (2022) – Mizuki
Soul Hackers 2 (2022) – Ringo
Tower of Fantasy (2023) - Annabella

Dubbing
Raya and the Last Dragon, Young Namaari

References

External links
 
Official agency profile 

1996 births
Living people
Anime singers
Hosei University alumni
Japanese child actresses
Japanese women pop singers
Japanese musical theatre actresses
Japanese video game actresses
Japanese voice actresses
Musicians from Saitama Prefecture
Voice actresses from Saitama Prefecture
21st-century Japanese women singers
21st-century Japanese singers